Ransome may refer to:
 Ransome, Queensland, Australia, a suburb of Brisbane
 6440 Ransome, an asteroid
 Ransome Airlines, a regional airline in the United States
 Ransome (surname)
 Ransome Gillett Holdridge (1836–1899), an early San Francisco school painter
 Ransome Judson Williams (1872–1970), American politician and 102nd Governor of South Carolina
 Ransome the Clown, a character from the game Thimbleweed Park
 Ransomes, Sims & Jefferies, a major British work vehicle and machinery maker, ended 1998
 Arthur Ransome (1884-1967), author

See also
Ransom (disambiguation)